Monte Martica is a mountain of Lombardy, Italy.

The waters of Monte Martica's river were channelled, thanks to a full hydraulic engineering project by banker Giuseppe Toeplitz to aliment the water attractions that he implanted in the gardens of his monumental Villa, Villa Toeplitz.

References

Mountains of the Alps
Mountains of Lombardy